is a compilation album by Japanese novelty heavy metal band Animetal, released through GT Music on October 12, 2011, to commemorate the band's 15th anniversary. The two-disc album includes the band's singles, plus medleys mixed from their previous studio albums.

The album peaked at No. 139 on Oricon's weekly albums chart.

Track listing
All tracks are arranged by Animetal, except where indicated.

Personnel 
 – Lead vocals
 – Guitar (except where indicated)
Syu – Guitar (Disc 2 tracks 2–8)
Masaki – Bass

with

 – Lead vocals (Animetal Lady tracks)
Katsuji – Drums (except where indicated)
 – Drums (Disc 1 tracks 1–4)
 – Drums (Disc 1 tracks 5, 7)
Shinki – Drums (9)
 – Keyboards (Disc 1 track 6)
 – Keyboards (Disc 1 track 10)

Charts

Footnotes

References

External links 

Animetal albums
2011 compilation albums
Japanese-language compilation albums
Sony Music Entertainment Japan compilation albums